Regent Olympic is a Sierra Leonean football club from Regent Road, a neighborhood in central Freetown, Sierra Leone. They were founded at Sierra Leone Grammar School. The club is currently playing in the Sierra Leone National First Division, the second highest football league in Sierra Leone. Led by former team manager Ali Wahbi In 1992 regent Olympic qualified for the first time in their history for the Wafu cup and earned 3rd position in the Sierra Leone premier league .

External links
http://www.rsssf.com/tabless/sier07.html

Football clubs in Sierra Leone
1924 establishments in Sierra Leone